The Champ Pickens Trophy, named for Alabama's Champ Pickens, was awarded to the champion of the Southern Conference as selected by a board of sportswriters from 1923 to 1926.

List of trophy winners

References

Southern Conference football
College football awards